AN/SPS-8 is a two-dimensional radar manufactured by General Electric. It was used by the US Navy as a height finding radar after World War II, and was equipped aboard naval ships during the Cold War. Variants include AN/SPS-8A, AN-SPS/8B, AN/SPS-8C and AN/SPS-8D After modernization, it was redesignated as AN/SPS-30.

AN/SPS-8 
It worked in two modes in terms of range - with a pulse frequency of 1000 Hz (pulse duration 1 μs, range 154 km) and 500 Hz (2 μs, 308 km). In a real situation, the F2H aircraft was detected at a distance of 111 km (SPS-8A / B modifications - 133 km).

The target elevation angle was determined by scanning the beam in the vertical plane with a frequency of 5, 10 or 20 Hz (in the SPS-8B modification -6, 12 and 16.5 Hz). The accuracy of determining the height was 150 m. The deflection of the beam in elevation was carried out by a Robinson Scanner feed in modifications SPS-8 and SPS-8A and an organ-type feed in modification SPS-8B

In the SPS-8A modification, the capacity was increased from 650 kW to 1 MW with a design capacity of 2 MW. In the 2-μs pulse mode, pulse repetition rates of 450 and 750 Hz were provided.

The SPS-8 and SPS-8A used the same mesh antennas. SPS-8B, first tested in January–June 1956 and put into service in 1959, had a high gain antenna (41 instead of 37.4 dB), a narrower beam (1.2 ° × 1.5 °) wider scanning sector in elevation (12 °) at a vertical scanning frequency of 6, 12 and 16.5 Hz.

The information was displayed on the VK circular view indicator (Model VK Plan Position Indicator) and the VL range-height indicator (Model VL Range-Height Indicator).

On board ships

United States 
 Essex-class aircraft carrier
  Midway-class aircraft carrier
 Forrestal-class aircraft carrier
 Independence-class aircraft carrier
 Iowa-class battleship
 Baltimore-class cruiser
 Worcester-class cruiser
 Boston-class cruiser
 Providence-class cruiser
 Galveston-class cruiser
 Mitscher-class destroyer
 Gearing-class destroyer
 Guardian-class radar picket ship

Canada 
 HMCS Bonaventure

AN/SPS-30 
Based on the SPS-8B, the best American sweeping beam radar, the SPS-30, was created, which used a high gain antenna and a 2.5 MW klystron. Work on its creation began in 1956. It is a three-dimensional radar.

It was planned to upgrade the SPS-8 and SPS-8A to SPS-8C / D with the installation of the same antennas and klystrons as on the SPS-30, but these plans were not implemented, although at the end of 1957, 30 new antennas were produced.

A modification of the SPS-8 was the CXRX radar,

On board ships

United States 
 Essex-class aircraft carrier
 Boston-class cruiser
 
 Galveston-class cruiser
 Gearing-class destroyer

Canada 
 HMCS Bonaventure

See More 

 List of radars
 Radar configurations and types
 Height finding radar

Citations

References 
 Norman Friedman (2006). The Naval Institute Guide to World Naval Weapon Systems.  Naval Institute Press.  ISBN 
 Self-Defense Force Equipment Yearbook 2006-2007. Asaun News Agency. ISBN 4-7509-1027-9

Naval radars
Military radars of the United States
Military equipment introduced in the 1950s